The International Council of Academies of Engineering and Technological Sciences (CAETS) is an independent nonpolitical and non-governmental international organization of engineering and technological sciences academies, one member academy per country, that advances the following objectives:

| Provide an independent nonpolitical and non-governmental international forum for enlightened dialog and communication of engineering and technological sciences;

| Contribute to advancing engineering and technological sciences in order to promote economic growth, sustainable development, and societal well-being throughout the world;

| Foster collaboration and the development of bi- and multi-lateral programs between the member academies;

| Prepare science-based proposals in order to advise governments and international organizations on policy issues related to engineering and technology development;

| Promote diversity and inclusion in the global engineering profession;

| Promote ethics in engineering education, research and practice;

| Contribute to continuous improvement and modernization of engineering education and practice internationally;

| Foster a balanced public understanding of the applications of engineering and technology; and

| Foster establishment of additional engineering academies in countries where none exist.

History

As of 2022, CAETS has 31 member academies.CAETS is incorporated as a 501(c)(3) non-profit corporation in the District of Columbia, US.
From 1985 till 2000 the name “Council of Academies of Engineering and Technological Sciences (CAETS)” was used, and upon 2000, the current name “International Council of Academies of Engineering and Technological Sciences, Inc. (CAETS) is in usage.

Organization

CAETS has Council (meets annually), Board of Directors and Executive Committee.

The CAETS Board of Directors includes four Officers (President: Denis Ranque; President-Elect: Neven Duić; Past-President: Manuel Solanet; Secretary/Treasurer: Ruth David) together with eight additional members elected by the Council to serve two year terms.

CAETS Member Academies:

Argentina:  Academia Nacional de Ingenieria (ANI)  - Elected to CAETS 1999 - website

Australia:  Australian Academy of Technology and Engineering (ATSE) - Elected to CAETS 1978 (Founding Member) - website

Belgium:  Royal Belgian Academy Council of Applied Sciences (BACAS) - Elected to CAETS 1990 - website

Canada:  Canadian Academy of Engineering (CAE) - Elected to CAETS 1991 - website

China:  Chinese Academy of Engineering (CAE) - Elected to CAETS 1997 - website

Croatia:  Croatian Academy of Engineering (HATZ) - Elected to CAETS 2000 - website

Czech Republic:  Engineering Academy of the Czech Republic - Elected to CAETS 1999 - website

Denmark:  Danish Academy of Technical Sciences (ATV) - Elected to CAETS 1987 - website

Finland: Council of Finnish Academies (CoFA) - Elected to CAETS 1989 - website

France:  National Academy of Technologies of France (NATF) - Elected to CAETS 1989 - website

Germany:  National Academy of Science and Engineering (acatech) - Elected to CAETS 2005 - website

Hungary:  Hungarian Academy of Engineering (HAE) - Elected to CAETS 1995 - website

India:  Indian National Academy of Engineering (INAE) - Elected to CAETS 1999 - website

Ireland:  Irish Academy of Engineering (IAE) - Elected to CAETS 2020 - website

Japan:  Engineering Academy of Japan (EAJ) - Elected to CAETS 1990 - website

Korea:  National Academy of Engineering of Korea (NAEK) - Elected to CAETS 2000 - website

Mexico:  Academy of Engineering of Mexico (AIM) - Elected to CAETS 1978 (Founding Member) - website

Netherlands:  Netherlands Academy of Technology and Innovation (AcTI) - Elected to CAETS 1993 - website

New Zealand:  Royal Society Te Aparangi (RSNZ) - Elected to CAETS 2019 - website

Nigeria: Nigerian Academy of Engineering (NAE) - Elected to CAETS 2019 - website 

Norway:  Norwegian Academy of Technological Sciences - Elected to CAETS 1990 - website

Pakistan:  Pakistan Academy of Engineering (PAE) - Elected to CAETS 2018 - website

Serbia:  Academy of Engineering Sciences of Serbia (AESS) - Elected to CAETS 2019 - website

Slovenia:  Slovenian Academy of Engineering (IAS) - Elected to CAETS 2000 - website

South Africa:  South African Academy of Engineering (SAAE) - Elected to CAETS 2009 - website

Spain:  Real Academia de Ingenieria (RAI) - Elected to CAETS 1999 - website

Sweden:  Royal Swedish Academy of Engineering Sciences (IVA) - Elected to CAETS 1978 (Founding Member) - website

Switzerland:  Swiss Academy of Engineering Sciences (SATW) - Elected to CAETS 1988 - website

United Kingdom:  Royal Academy of Engineering (RAEng) - Elected to CAETS 1978 (Founding Member) - website

United States:  National Academy of Engineering (NAE) - Elected to CAETS 1978 (Founding Member) - website

Uruguay:  National Academy of Engineering of Uruguay - Elected to CAETS 2000 - website

Statements

In October 2007, CAETS issued a Statement on Environment and Sustainable Growth:
As reported by the Intergovernmental Panel on Climate Change (IPCC), most of the observed global warming since the mid-20th century is very likely due to human-produced emission of greenhouse gases and this warming will continue unabated if present anthropogenic emissions continue or, worse, expand without control.
CAETS, therefore, endorses the many recent calls to decrease and control greenhouse gas emissions to an acceptable level as quickly as possible.

In following years, CAETS has issued statements as listed: 

2008: Delta Technology for a Sustainable and Habitable Planet

2009: Global Natural Resources – Management and Sustainability

2010: Sustainable Food Systems – Toward Food for All 

2011: Engineering Analysis and Management to Reduce Risks

2012: Urban Development and Public Transportation: Improved Understanding of the Interdependencies

2013: Educating Engineers

2014: Engineering and the Future of Humankind

2015: Pathways to Sustainability in the Energy, Mobility and Health Care Sectors

2018: Sustainable Development of Agricultural and Forestry Systems

2019: Engineering a Better World – The Next 100 Years

2020: Engineering a Better World – Smart Society 

2021: CAETS Statement on COP26

2022: CAETS Statement on Invasion of Ukraine

References

Engineering societies
Non-profit organizations based in Washington, D.C.
International professional associations
National academies of engineering